Badger were a British rock band from the early 1970s. The band was founded by keyboardist Tony Kaye after he left Yes, along with bassist and vocalist David Foster.

Background
David Foster had been in the Warriors with Jon Anderson before Anderson co-founded Yes. Foster later worked with the band on their second album Time and a Word (1970). Kaye had worked on a solo project by Foster that was never released.

The pair found drummer Roy Dyke, formerly of Ashton, Gardner and Dyke, and Dyke suggested guitarist and vocalist Brian Parrish formerly of Parrish & Gurvitz  which later became Frampton's Camel (after Parrish left P&G) on guitar. The new band began rehearsing in September 1972 and signed to Atlantic Records.

One Live Badger (1973)
Badger's first release was the live album, One Live Badger, produced by Jon Anderson and Geoffrey Haslam, and was taken from a show opening for Yes at London's Rainbow Theatre. Five of the songs were co-written by the whole band, with a sixth by Parrish (initially written for Parrish & Gurvitz). The cover art was done by Roger Dean, the artist responsible for many of Yes's album covers, although Kaye left Yes before their partnership with Roger Dean.

 One live Badger 
 Tony Kaye ; Hammond organ, piano, Minimoog, mellotron
 Brian Parrish : Guitar
 David Foster : Bass guitar
 Roy Dyke ; Drums

Content of the album 
 Wheel Of Fortune 7:40
 Fountain 7:12
 Wind Of Change 7:00
 River 7:00
 The Preacher 3:35
 On The Way home 7:10

White Lady (1974)
By 1974, the band had been reduced to Kaye and Dyke. They recruited bassist Kim Gardner, who had worked with Dyke in Ashton, Gardner and Dyke. Paul Pilnick, formerly of Stealers Wheel, joined on guitar, as did singer Jackie Lomax.

Lomax proceeded to turn them into the type of R&B/soul band he had used on his solo albums. The band became a vehicle for Lomax's songs and singing. During this period, they released one album, White Lady, on Epic Records, produced by Allen Toussaint. All ten songs were written or co-written by Lomax. Guests on the album included Jeff Beck (contributing a guitar solo to the title track).

However, before the album's release, the band had split into two factions, with Lomax and Gardner leading a short-lived band called White Lady, before Lomax returned to a solo career.

"White Lady" b/w "Don't Pull the Trigger" was released as a single in May 1974.

 White Lady
 Tony Kaye : Keyboards, Minimoog, mellotron 
 Jackie Lomax : Vocals, rhythm guitar
 Paul Pilnick : Lead guitar
 Kim Gardner : Bass guitar 
 Roy Dyke : Drums

 Additional musicians 
 Jeff Beck : Lead Guitar on White Lady 
 Barry Bailey : Slide Guitar on Don't pull the trigger, White Lady, Be with you and 	Lord Who Give Me Life
 Allen Toussaint : Horns, congas, piano, organ, background vocals 
 Carl Blouin : Baritone saxophone, flute
 Alvin Thomas : Tenor saxophone
 Lester Caliste : Trumpet
 John Lango : Trombone 
 Joan Harmon, Mercedes Davis, Teresipa Henry : Background vocals
 Jessie Smith and Bobby Montgomery : Background vocals on Everybody Nobody and One More Dream To Hold

Content of the album 
 A dream of you 4:15
 Everybody Nobody 3'26
 Listen to me 4:57
 Don't pull the trigger 4:06
 Just the way it goes 4:41
 White Lady 4:46 
 Be with you 3:47
 Lord Who Give Me Life 3:04 
 One More Dream To Hold 4:04 
 The hole thing 6:10

See also
 British rock

References

External links
 Badger biography, discography and album reviews, credits & releases at AllMusic.com
 Badger discography, album releases & credits at Discogs.com
 Badger biography at eMusic
 David Foster - Open Road album releases & credits at Discogs.com
 Badger - One Live Badger (1973) album credits at Yescography entry

English progressive rock groups
Musical groups established in 1973
Atco Records artists